Da Dirty 30 is the only studio album by American hip hop trio Cru. It was released on June 15, 1997, as a joint production by Def Jam Recordings and Violator Entertainment, with the entire production of the album coming from the group's producer Yogi. It features guest appearances from Black Rob, Anthony Hamilton, Antoinette, Jim Hydro, Ras Kass, Slick Rick, The Lox and Tracey Lee. The album was met with positive reviews but was not a huge commercial success, peaking at number 102 on the Billboard 200, number 26 on the Top R&B/Hip-Hop Albums and topped the Top Heatseekers.

Two singles made it to the charts: "Just Another Case", which made it to No. 68 on the Billboard Hot 100, and "Bubblin'", which peaked at No. 23 on the Hot Rap Singles chart.

Track listing

Personnel
Taj Sidhu – recording, mixing
Rich Travali – mixing
Tony Smalios – mixing
Brian Miller – mixing
Tom Coyne – mastering
"Baby" Chris Lighty – executive producer, A&R
Mark Pitts – associate executive producer, management
Chad "Chaddio" Santiago – associate executive producer
Anthony "The Mighty Ha" Holmes – associate executive producer
Jeremy "Yogi Bear" Graham – associate executive producer
David "Dave" Lighty – A&R
Danny Clinch – photography

Charts

References

External links

1997 debut albums
Def Jam Recordings albums